Séguénéga Airport  is a public use airstrip located near Séguénéga, Yatenga Province, Burkina Faso.

See also
List of airports in Burkina Faso

References

External links 
 Airport record for Séguénéga Airport at Landings.com

Airports in Burkina Faso
Yatenga Province